Riccardo Stacchini (born 29 October 1965) is a Sammarinese alpine skier. He competed in two events at the 1988 Winter Olympics.

References

1965 births
Living people
Sammarinese male alpine skiers
Olympic alpine skiers of San Marino
Alpine skiers at the 1988 Winter Olympics